The 2018 World Modern Pentathlon Championships was held in Mexico City, Mexico from 6 to 15 September 2018.

Medal summary

Medal table

Men

Women

Mixed

Broadcasting rights

References

World Modern Pentathlon Championships
World Modern Pentathlon Championships
International sports competitions hosted by Mexico
Sports competitions in Mexico City
2018 in modern pentathlon
World Modern Pentathlon Championships